Srnjak is a small settlement in the hills southwest of Turjak and northwest of Rašica in the Municipality of Velike Lašče in central Slovenia. The municipality is part of the traditional region of Lower Carniola and is now included in the Central Slovenia Statistical Region.

References

External links
Srnjak on Geopedia

Populated places in the Municipality of Velike Lašče